New Money is a 2018 Nigerian film directed by Tope Oshin with production by Inkblot Productions and FilmOne. It tells the story of a sales girl who dreams of becoming a fashion designer and subsequently receives an unexpected inheritance from her absentee father.  Released in March 2018, it stars Jemima Osunde, Kate Henshaw, Blossom Chukwujekwu, Dakore Akande, Wale Ojo Osas Ighodaro and Falz d Bahd Guy.

Plot 
Twenty-three year old Toun (Jemima Osunde), finds herself thrown into the world of the rich after her father (Kalu Ikeagwu) left his multibillion-dollar company to her in his will.
She learns that her mother, Fatima (Kate Henshaw) was legally married to her father, Ifeanyi, although, due to strong opposition from his family, the marriage was annulled. He remarried, this time to Ebube (Dakore Akande), but they never had any children together.
She ignored her mother and entered into a life of luxury which is threatened by her uncle, Chuka (Wale Ojo) and his son, Patrick (Adeolu Adefarasin). Her decisions put the company in a negative light and portrays her as inferior CEO.Thrown in the mix of all of this, Toun struggles to find her old self again while pushing away old friends and falsely accusing new ones. Through this all, Joseph (Blossom Chukwujekwu) stands by her.

Cast 
 Jemima Osunde as Toun 
 Blossom Chukwujekwu as Joseph
 Kate Henshaw as Fatima
 Dakore Akande as Ebube
 Wale Ojo as Chuka
 Wofai Fada as Binta
 Adeolu Adefarasin as Patrick
 Osas Ighodaro as Angela
 Daniel Etim Effiong as Ganiyu Osamede
 Falz as Quam
 Kalu Ikeagwu as Ifeanyi
 Femi Branch
 Bikiya Graham-Douglas
 Rita Edwards as Manager
 Yolanda Okereke

Theatrical Release 
The film was premiered at the Imax Cinema in Lekki, Lagos State by Inkblot Productions and FilmOne Distributions on the 23rd of March 2018.

Reception 
New Money received mixed reviews from critics. Nollywood Reinvented referred to the movie as being "Disney-like", highlighting the lack of depth in the story as well as the over-saturation of popular music. NR, however, praised the performances in the movie. Ife Olujuyigbe of True Nollywood Stories (TNS) praised the movie for the casting, music selection and rich dialogue but criticized it for what she called 'a rather flat ending and a poster that begs for originality'. Overall, she rates the movie 80%. Ayomide Crit praised the storytelling, production and casting but was of the opinion that the storyline lacked sufficient depth. The critic also held the opinion that the directorial composition was averagely done and finally described the movie as 'just there, nothing spectacular and nothing remarkable'. Chidumga Izuzu of Pulse Nigeria praised the acting of Jemima Osunde in portraying the character of Toun. She also praised the chemistry between characters but stated that the movie is not as intense as director Oshin's previous works.

Sequel
In 2020 a sequel was filmed titled Quam's Money. The follow-up story follows what happens when a security guard (Quam) suddenly becomes a multi-millionaire. The new cast was led by Falz, Toni Tones, Jemima Osunde, Blossom Chukwujekwu and Nse Ikpe-Etim.

See also
  List of Nigerian films of 2018

References 



2018 films
English-language Nigerian films
Nigerian comedy-drama films
2010s English-language films